Monika Leová (born 23 July 1991 in Prague) is a Czech model, beauty pageant titleholder and TV presenter who won Czech Miss in 2013. Monika was born in the Czech Republic to a Vietnamese father (Lê Đình Châu) and a Czech mother. She is fluent in English and Russian.

See also 
 Lê dynasty

References

External links

 
 Monika Leová's biography (osobnosti.cz) 
 

Living people
1991 births
Czech beauty pageant winners
Czech female models
Models from Prague
Czech people of Vietnamese descent
Miss Earth 2013 contestants
Czech television presenters
Czech women television presenters